Empis bicuspidata  is a species of fly in the family Empididae. It is included in the subgenus Empis. It is found in the  Palearctic.

References

Empis
Insects described in 1927
Diptera of Europe
Taxa named by James Edward Collin